The University of Santo Tomas Faculty of Pharmacy is the pharmaceutical school of the University of Santo Tomas, the oldest and the largest Catholic university in Manila, Philippines.

Established in 1871, the faculty is the first school of pharmacy in the Philippines. It consistently tops the philippine licensure examinations for pharmacy and medical technology.

History
The Facultad de Medicina y Farmacia or the Faculty of Medicine and Pharmacy was founded in May 28, 1871 by virtue of the modification of the Moret decree.  The 6-year pharmacy program was offered. Don Leon Ma. Guerrero is considered to be the first graduate of the faculty. In 1901, when the American administration took over, the pharmacy curriculum was revised to four years. Also in the same year, the faculty was separated from the Faculty of Medicine and Surgery. Throughout the years, changes were made in the length of the program, from three years to five years. In 1984, the curriculum was set to four years.

In 1924, the faculty was the first college of the university to admit female students.

During the deanship of Fr. Lorenzo Rodriguez, O.P., two new programs were offered and the university botanical garden was reestablished. In 1958, medical technology was first offered in the faculty as an elective course. In 1959, A 3-year program in medical technology was approved. The following year, the fourth year internship was given permission. In June 14, 1961, medical technology was recognized as a degree-level program. In 1962, the 5-year program of biochemistry was established. Forty-two students graduated in the program in 1967. In 1985, it was reduced to four years. The university was first to offer all the three programs.

A program in botany was offered in the faculty in 1986. However, it was discontinued in 2004 because of its limited enrolees.

The Commission on Higher Education identifies the pharmacy and medical technology programs as Centers of Excellence.

Academic programs

The faculty offers the following academic degree programs:
 Pharmacy (1871) – CHED Center of Excellence, PACUCOA Level IV program, AUN certified program
 Clinical pharmacy (2010)
 Doctor of Pharmacy (2017)
 Medical Technology (1959) – CHED Center of Excellence, PACUCOA Level III program, AUN certified program
 Biochemistry (1962) – PACUCOA Level III program, AUN certified program
 Botany (1986–2004) (defunct)
 Master's and Doctoral programs of Medical Technology (2016) and Pharmacy are offered in the UST Graduate School.

Research
The faculty performs its research engagements at the UST Research Center for the Natural Sciences and Applied Sciences (RCNAS), the science and technology research arm of the university at the Thomas Aquinas Research Center (TARC). Most of the research programs of the faculty deal with Molecular Diagnostics and Therapeutics, and Natural Products for Health and Wellness. RCNAS publishes its research papers, short communications, and review papers in the journal Acta Manilana.

Notable Alumni
Janine Tugonon, Miss Universe 2012 1st runner-up

References 

Educational institutions established in 1871
Pharmacy
1871 establishments in the Philippines